"Course for Collision" is a 1966 Australian TV play.

It aired as part of Wednesday Theatre. Australian TV drama was relatively rare at the time.

Plot
In the near future, the US president faces a challenge.

Cast
Bill Yule as Major Hale
Carl Bleazby as the President
Keith Lee as Captain Shaw
Frank Wilson as General Patrick
Tim Evans
Mike Dyer
Jon Ewing
George Mallaby

Production
It was shot in Melbourne.

References

External links
 Wednesday Theatre at Austlit

1967 television plays
1967 Australian television episodes
1960s Australian television plays
Wednesday Theatre (season 3) episodes